Sabina Valbusa (born 21 January 1972 in Verona) is an Italian cross-country skier who competed from 1993 to 2010.

Biography
Competing in five Winter Olympics, she earned a bronze medal in the 4 × 5 km relay at the 2006 Winter Olympics in Turin. Her best individual finish was a ninth in the 5 km + 5 km combined pursuit at the 2002 Winter Olympics in Salt Lake City.

Valbusa earned three medals in the 4 × 5 km relay at the FIS Nordic World Ski Championships (silver: 1999, bronze :2001, 2005). Her best individual finish was a fourth in the individual sprint in 2001. Her only individual victory came at Pragelato, Italy in a 15 km event in 2004.

She is the younger sister of cross-country skier Fulvio Valbusa.

Cross-country skiing results
All results are sourced from the International Ski Federation (FIS).

Olympic Games
 1 medal – (1 bronze)

World Championships
 3 medals – (1 silver, 2 bronze)

a.  Cancelled due to extremely cold weather.

World Cup

Season standings

Individual podiums
1 victory – (1 ) 
10 podiums – (9 , 1 )

Team podiums

 4 victories – (2 , 2 ) 
 24 podiums – (20 , 4 )

Note:  Until the 1999 World Championships, World Championship races were included in the World Cup scoring system.

Italian Championships
 1993: 3rd, Italian women's championships of cross-country skiing, 30 km
 1994:
 3rd, Italian women's championships of cross-country skiing, 15 km
 3rd, Italian women's championships of cross-country skiing, 10 km
 1995:
 2nd, Italian women's championships of cross-country skiing, 5 km
 3rd, Italian women's championships of cross-country skiing, 10 km
 1997:
 1st, Italian women's championships of cross-country skiing, 30 km
 2nd, Italian women's championships of cross-country skiing, 15 km
 2nd, Italian women's championships of cross-country skiing, 10 km
 3rd, Italian women's championships of cross-country skiing, 5 km
 1998:
 2nd, Italian women's championships of cross-country skiing, 30 km
 2nd, Italian women's championships of cross-country skiing, 10 km
 3rd, Italian women's championships of cross-country skiing, 5 km
 1999:
 2nd, Italian women's championships of cross-country skiing, 10 km
 2nd, Italian women's championships of cross-country skiing, 5 km
 2000:
 2nd, Italian women's championships of cross-country skiing, 30 km
 2nd, Italian women's championships of cross-country skiing, 5 km
 3rd, Italian women's championships of cross-country skiing, 15 km
 3rd, Italian women's championships of cross-country skiing, 10 km
 2001:
 1st, Italian women's championships of cross-country skiing, sprint
 3rd, Italian women's championships of cross-country skiing, 15 km
 3rd, Italian women's championships of cross-country skiing, 5 km pursuit
 2002: 2nd, Italian women's championships of cross-country skiing, sprint
 2003:
 1st, Italian women's championships of cross-country skiing, 10 km duathlon
 1st, Italian women's championships of cross-country skiing, 5 km pursuit
 2nd, Italian women's championships of cross-country skiing, 15 km
 3rd, Italian women's championships of cross-country skiing, sprint
 2004:
 1st, Italian women's championships of cross-country skiing, 10 km
 1st, Italian women's championships of cross-country skiing, 7.5 km free & classic
 1st, Italian women's championships of cross-country skiing, 5 km pursuit
 3rd, Italian women's championships of cross-country skiing, 30 km
 2005:
 1st, Italian women's championships of cross-country skiing, 10 km
 2nd, Italian women's championships of cross-country skiing, 2 x 7.5 km pursuit
 2006: 2nd, Italian women's championships of cross-country skiing, 30 km
 2007:
 1st, Italian women's championships of cross-country skiing, 10 km
 2nd, Italian women's championships of cross-country skiing, 2 x 7.5 km pursuit
 2008:
 1st, Italian women's championships of cross-country skiing, 2 x 7.5 km pursuit
 1st, Italian women's championships of cross-country skiing, 10 km
 2010: 1st, Italian women's championships of cross-country skiing, 10 km

References

External links
 
 
 

1972 births
Cross-country skiers at the 1994 Winter Olympics
Cross-country skiers at the 1998 Winter Olympics
Cross-country skiers at the 2002 Winter Olympics
Cross-country skiers at the 2006 Winter Olympics
Cross-country skiers at the 2010 Winter Olympics
Italian female cross-country skiers
Living people
Olympic cross-country skiers of Italy
Olympic bronze medalists for Italy
Olympic medalists in cross-country skiing
FIS Nordic World Ski Championships medalists in cross-country skiing
Medalists at the 2006 Winter Olympics